Griffin Logue (born 13 April 1998) is a professional Australian rules footballer playing for the North Melbourne Football Club in the Australian Football League (AFL), having previously played for the Fremantle Football Club.

AFL career

Logue was drafted by Fremantle with their first selection and eighth overall in the 2016 national draft.

Late in the round 15 match against , Logue gave away a crucial 50-metre penalty after he failed to correctly return the ball to Nick Riewoldt, who had fooled Logue into thinking that he had taken a mark inside forward 50; in fact, it was Tim Membrey who took the mark, and he would later kick a goal from the 50-metre penalty to give his side a nine-point win.

Logue had a strong start to the 2020 season but only played 5 games due to a toe injury sustained in Fremantle's round 5 match against .  Logue had a consistent year in 2021, playing a 16 out of a possible 22 games; his most games in any season. With injuries to Joel Hamling and Alex Pearce (who returned later in the season) leaving Fremantle with limited tall defence options, Logue was often tasked with playing on the oppositions' tallest forwards.

After starting the 2022 AFL season playing in defence Logue made his forward debut during Fremantle's round eleven clash against Melbourne. Logue again played forward during Fremantle's round twelve clash against Brisbane collecting 13 disposals, seven marks and kicking two goals.

Personal life
Logue grew up in Perth Western Australia and attended Guildford Grammar, where he was in the school's first XVIII. Logue also represented the school in the 1st VIII for rowing. Griffin's uncle is basketballer Andrew Vlahov and his grandparents, Eva and Len Vlahov, were track and field athletes.

Statistics
 Statistics are correct to the end of round 10, 2022

|- style="background-color: #EAEAEA"
! scope="row" style="text-align:center" | 2017
|
| 2 || 13 || 1 || 3 || 71 || 51 || 122 || 53 || 23 || 0.1 || 0.2 || 5.5 || 3.9 || 9.4 || 4.1 || 1.8
|-
! scope="row" style="text-align:center" | 2018
|
| 2 || 0 || – || – || – || – || – || – || – || – || – || – || – || – || – || – || –
|- style="background-color: #EAEAEA"
! scope="row" style="text-align:center" | 2019
|
| 2 || 10 || 0 || 0 || 66 || 54 || 120 || 45 || 19 || 0.0 || 0.0 || 6.6 || 5.4 || 12.0 || 4.5 || 1.9
|-
! scope="row" style="text-align:center" | 2020
|
| 2 || 5 || 0 || 0 || 22 || 27 || 49 || 12 || 5 || 0.0 || 0.0 || 4.4 || 5.4 || 9.8 || 2.4 || 1.0
|- style="background-color: #EAEAEA"
! scope="row" style="text-align:center" | 2021
|
| 2 || 16 || 0 || 0 || 113 || 71 || 184 || 76 || 22 || 0.0 || 0.0 || 7.1 || 4.4 || 11.5 || 4.8 || 1.4
|-
! scope="row" style="text-align:center" | 2022
|
| 2 || 7 || 0 || 0 || 51 || 56 || 107 || 47 || 11 || 0.0 || 0.0 || 7.3 || 8.0 || 15.3 || 6.7 || 1.6
|- class="sortbottom"
! colspan=3| Career
! 51
! 1
! 3
! 323
! 259
! 582
! 233
! 80
! 0.0
! 0.1
! 6.3
! 5.1
! 11.4
! 4.6
! 1.6
|}

Notes

References

External links

1998 births
Living people
Fremantle Football Club players
Swan Districts Football Club players
Peel Thunder Football Club players
Australian rules footballers from Western Australia
People educated at Guildford Grammar School
Australian people of Croatian descent
Australian people of Latvian descent